Phoca Download is an open-source project, download managing software which runs in Joomla! CMS. It is programmed in PHP and runs on  web server with enabled PHP support and installed Joomla!. It includes component, modules and plugins and allows users to display files on their websites which can be downloaded, played, previewed.

Phoca Download renders categories and their subcategories. Categories include files which can be downloaded from the site by the visitors. Users logged in Phoca Download frontend can upload and manage files. In administration both - uploaded and downloaded files can be seen and statistics of them is displayed. Frontend users can rate rendered files. Files (pdf, images) can be previewed, other files (flv, mp3, mp4, ogg, ogv) can be played in the browser. Files can be stored on the server where Phoca Download runs but they can be stored on external server. Phoca Download then links such external files. Phoca Download includes Joomla! access system. It means, files or categories can be accessed only for specific group or users.

Phoca Download is standard Joomla! extension and it can be extended by plugins and modules. There are many different modules and plugins for Phoca Download listed on Joomla! extensions directory.

History
Phoca Download 3 is the current release of Phoca Download. It is based on Phoca Download 2 and overwritten for Joomla 3.  Phoca Download 3.1.2 was released on May 2, 2016.

Phoca Download 2 was released on June 18, 2011. Component was overwritten for Joomla! 1.6 and new features were added.

Phoca Download 1 was released on July 25, 2008. Phoca Download was new download manager component for Joomla CMS.

Requirements
Phoca Download 3 is running under Joomla! 3, so it requires:
MySQL 5.1 or greater, or MSSQL	10.50.1600.1 or greater, or PostgreSQL 8.3.18 or greater
PHP version 5.3.1 or greater
Joomla! version 3 or greater

Phoca Download 2 requires:
MySQL 5.0.4 or greater
PHP version 5.2.4 or greater
Joomla! version 1.6 or 1.7 or 2.5 or greater

Examples 
These are examples of websites using Phoca Download:
Phoca Download Site

See also
Joomla!

Further reading
 O'Reilly Joomla!-Websites erweitern und optimieren, by Tim Schürmann. .
 Elex Media Komputindo Kupas Tuntas Ekstension Terbaik Joomla, by Yuhefizar, S. Kom. .
 Packt Publishing Joomla! 1.5 Top Extensions Cookbook, by Suhreed Sarkar. .

References

External links
Phoca Download Website
Phoca Download Documentation Site
Phoca Download Site
Phoca Download Demo Site - Joomla! 1.5
Phoca Download and Joomla! 2.5 demo site
Phoca Download and Joomla! 3 demo site

Free content management systems
Free software programmed in PHP
Content management systems
Cross-platform software